Little Robinson Crusoe is a 1924 American comedy film starring Jackie Coogan. The film was directed by Edward F. Cline and written by Willard Mack.

Plot
Mickey Hogan (Jackie Coogan) is an orphan cabin boy on a ship commanded by a cruel captain (Tom Santschi). His only friend is a black cat, called Man Friday. A storm shipwrecks Mickey on an island, where is made into a captive war god. The next island is run by a white man Adolphe Schmidt (Bert Sprotte), who lives there with his daughter Gretta (Gloria Grey).

Cast
 Jackie Coogan as Mickey Hogan
 Chief Daniel J. O'Brien as Chief of Police
 Will Walling as Captain of Police
 Tom Santschi as Captain Dynes
 Clarence Wilson as 'Singapore' Scroggs
 Eddie Boland as Wireless Operator
 Noble Johnson as Marimba (cannibal chief)
 Tote Du Crow as Ugandi Medicine Man
 Bert Sprotte as Adolphe Schmidt
 Gloria Grey as Gretta Schmidt

Preservation
A copy of Little Robinson Crusoe is housed at the Gosfilmofond in Moscow.

References

External links

1924 films
American black-and-white films
Metro-Goldwyn-Mayer films
American silent feature films
1924 comedy films
Films directed by Edward F. Cline
Films based on Robinson Crusoe
Films about survivors of seafaring accidents or incidents
Silent American comedy films
1920s American films
Silent adventure films